The Athinais Cultural Center is a "multi-purpose" conference complex in Athens, Greece. It hosts business events, cultural activities, and entertainment. It also contains an art gallery with a permanent exhibition of contemporary Greek art. The building was originally a silk factory, since renovated.

External links
Official site > art gellery
www.wcities.com
www.conferencesgreece.gr
07/11/2002 www.ekathimerini.com

Art museums and galleries in Greece
Museums in Athens